Merito may refer to:

People
Merito Acosta (1896-1963), a Cuban-born professional baseball player in the United States
Gerry Merito (1938-2009), a New Zealand singer and guitarist

Places
Merítő, the Hungarian name for Mereteu village, Vințu de Jos Commune, Alba County, Romania

Ships
USS Merito (SP-279), a United States Navy patrol vessel in commission in 1917